The inaugural America's Cup World Series were held between 2011 and 2013 in the lead up to the 2013 America's Cup. They were raced in AC45 catamarans. The competition was rocked by a cheating scandal in which Oracle Team USA had made an unauthorized modification by using additional ballast. The team withdrew from the competition on 8 August 2013. Penalties imposed included expelling three team members,  a $250,000 fine, and a one-point penalty for each of the first two races of the Match in which they would otherwise score a point. This also affected boats on loan to Ben Ainslie Racing and HS Racing, which withdrew from the competition. After reallocating points, overall winner for 2011/2012 was declared to be Team New Zealand, and for 2012/2013 it was Luna Rossa Piranha.

Teams

AC45 World Series

From the Newport AC45 World Series through all the second season of racing, all Oracle Racing boats (including those loaned to Ben Ainslie and HS Racing) were found to have raced out of measurement, with a 3 kg ballast surplus in the dolphin striker. All points are therefore subject to change and a new winner for both seasons to be declared.

References

External links
The America's Cup
America's Cup results
Plans of the AC45

See also
2013 America's Cup

America's Cup World Series
America's Cup World Series
2011 in American sports
2011 in Portuguese sport
2011 in English sport
2012 in Italian sport
2012 in American sports
2013 in Italian sport
America's Cup World Series
America's Cup World Series
2013 America's Cup